The 2019–20 Handball Championship of Bosnia and Herzegovina was the 19th season of this championship, with teams from Bosnia and Herzegovina participating in it. HRK Izviđač were the men's defending champions, and HŽRK Grude were the women's defending champions.

By the decision of the Handball Federation, the season ended on June 1, 2020, after the calendar scheduled for the season expired, because of the interruption of the competition caused by the coronavirus pandemic.

The ranking was determined after 18 rounds (13 for women) played before the competition was stopped.

RK Borac m:tel won the men's title, HŽRK Grude won the women's title.

Premier handball league for men

Competition format 
Sixteen teams joined the regular season, played as double round robin tournament.

2019–20 Season participants 

The following 16 clubs competed in the Handball Premier League during the 2019–20 season.

Standings

Clubs in European competitions

Premier handball league for women

Competition format 
Twelve teams joined the regular season, played as double round robin tournament.

2019–20 Season participants 
The following 12 clubs competed in the Handball Premier League during the 2019–20 season.

Standings

References 

Handball Championship of Bosnia and Herzegovina
2019–20 domestic handball leagues